The 2008 Six Nations Championship, known as the 2008 RBS 6 Nations because of sponsorship by the Royal Bank of Scotland, was the ninth series of the rugby union Six Nations Championship, the 114th series of the international championship.

Fifteen matches were played over five weekends from 2 February to 15 March, resulting in Wales winning the Grand Slam, their second in the last four championships and tenth overall. In winning the Grand Slam, Wales also won the Triple Crown, for beating each of the other Home Nations, for the 19th time. Wales conceded only two tries in the championship, beating England's previous record of four tries conceded. Wales' Shane Williams was named the Player of the Championship.

Participants

The teams involved were:

Squads

Table

Results

Round 1

This was Wales' first win over England at Twickenham Stadium for 20 years.

Round 2

Round 3

 Ireland won the Centenary Quaich.

Jonny Wilkinson drew level with Wales' Neil Jenkins as the all-time leading point scorer in international rugby history with 1,090 career points (including points scored for the British and Irish Lions).
This result left Wales as the only remaining team that could win the Grand Slam.
This was England's first away win over France in the Six Nations since their 15–9 win in 2000.

Round 4

 Shane Williams drew level with Gareth Thomas as the all-time try leader for Wales with his 40th try.
 Wales won the Triple Crown.

 England's Jonny Wilkinson became the all-time scoring leader in international rugby history, surpassing Wales' Neil Jenkins.
 Scotland won the Calcutta Cup.

 France won their second consecutive Giuseppe Garibaldi Trophy.

Round 5

Despite victory over the Scots, Italy won the "wooden spoon", having failed to win by the necessary five-point margin required to avoid finishing at the bottom of the table.

 England won the Millennium Trophy for the first time in five years.

Shane Williams took sole possession of the all-time try scoring lead for Wales with his 41st try.
Wales won the Grand Slam for the second time in four championships.
By virtue of Wales beating France by more than three points, England finished second in the table, their best Six Nations finish since  2003.
Wales conceded just two tries all championship, the tightest ever defence in the Six Nations.

Scorers

Notes

References

 
2008 rugby union tournaments for national teams
2008
2007–08 in European rugby union
2007–08 in Irish rugby union
2007–08 in English rugby union
2007–08 in Welsh rugby union
2007–08 in Scottish rugby union
2007–08 in French rugby union
2007–08 in Italian rugby union
February 2008 sports events in Europe
March 2008 sports events in Europe
Royal Bank of Scotland